The 4th Houston Film Critics Society Awards were presented on December 18, 2010. These awards for "extraordinary accomplishment in film" are presented annually by the Houston Film Critics Society (HFCS) based in Houston, Texas. The organization, founded in 2007, includes 22 film critics for print, radio, television, and internet publications in the greater Houston area. The awards are co-sponsored by the Houston Film Commission, Southwest Alternate Media Project, Women in Film and Television/Houston, WorldFest, and the Houston Cinema Arts Society.

The nominations for the 2010 awards were announced on December 12, 2010. Eligible films do not need to have played or opened in a Houston film theater prior to the nomination deadline, merely made available to the HFCS membership at a screening or on DVD.  Along with the 13 "best of" category awards, this year also saw the introduction of a new category for "Worst Movies of the Year". The Social Network, True Grit, and 127 Hours each received six nominations, all including the Best Picture, Actor, Direction, and Original Score categories.

The Social Network was the HFCS's most awarded film of 2010 taking top honors in the Best Picture, Best Director (David Fincher), Best Actor (Jesse Eisenberg), and Best Screenplay (Aaron Sorkin) categories. Inception was the only other film to garner multiple awards, winning both the Best Original Score (Hans Zimmer) and Best Cinematography (Wally Pfister) prizes. The other acting awards went to Natalie Portman as Best Actress for Black Swan, Hailee Steinfeld as Best Supporting Actress for True Grit, and Christian Bale as Best Supporting Actor for The Fighter.  The remaining film honors went to Toy Story 3 as Best Animated Film, Restrepo as Best Documentary, and The Girl with the Dragon Tattoo as Best Foreign Language Film. "We Are Sex Bob-Omb" by Beck from Scott Pilgrim vs. the World was named the Best Original Song. The HFCS's first-ever award for "Worst Picture" was given to Jonah Hex starring Josh Brolin.

In addition to the category awards, the HFCS presented their annual Lifetime Achievement Award to Sissy Spacek and its Humanitarian Award to George Clooney.  Clooney was selected for "selflessly using his celebrity for greater good". The HFCS award for Outstanding Achievement in Cinema awards were presented to Charles Dove, director of the Rice University Media Center, and Hector Luna, the founder and editor of C-47 Houston.

Ceremony
The 2010 awards were given out at a ceremony held at the Museum of Fine Arts on December 18, 2010. The award ceremony was free and open to the general public. While organizers did not expect any of the nominees in the "best of" category awards to be in attendance, director Edgar Wright recorded a thank-you clip which was shown.  The ceremony also included clips of nominated films plus special tributes to George Clooney and Sissy Spacek, and was followed by a catered reception with the members of the HFCS in the museum gallery. Catering for the reception was provided by Central Market.

Winners and nominees
Winners are listed first and highlighted with boldface.

Category awards

Individual awards

Lifetime Achievement Award
 Sissy Spacek

Humanitarian Award
 George Clooney

Outstanding Achievement in Cinema
 Charles Dove, director of the Rice University Media Center
 Hector Luna, founder and editor of C-47 Houston magazine

References

External links
 Houston Film Critics Society official website

2010
2010 film awards
2010 in Texas
Houston